Henry Moses may refer to

 Henry Moses (engraver) (1782?–1870), English engraver
 Henry Moses (politician) (1832–1926), New South Wales politician
 Harry Moses (1858–1938),  Australian cricketer
 Henry C. Moses (1941–2008), American educator